Zhao Zhonghao (born 8 August 1995) is a Chinese sport shooter.

He participated at the 2018 ISSF World Shooting Championships, winning a medal.

He has qualified to represent China at the 2020 Summer Olympics.

References

External links

Living people
1995 births
Chinese male sport shooters
ISSF rifle shooters
Universiade gold medalists for China
Universiade medalists in shooting
Medalists at the 2015 Summer Universiade
Shooters at the 2020 Summer Olympics
21st-century Chinese people